Potiskavec is a village in the southern part of the Municipality of Dobrepolje in Slovenia. The municipality is included in the Central Slovenia Statistical Region. The area is part of the historical region of Lower Carniola.

References

External links
Potiskavec on Geopedia

Populated places in the Municipality of Dobrepolje